The Gehrihorn is a mountain of the Bernese Alps, overlooking Frutigen in the Bernese Oberland. It lies at the northern end of the range between the Kandertal and the Kiental.

References

External links
 Gehrihorn on Hikr

Mountains of the Alps
Mountains of Switzerland
Mountains of the canton of Bern
Two-thousanders of Switzerland